Organization of Japanese defensive units in Okinawa prior to the American invasion.

The defense of Okinawa Island was weakened when the 9th Division was 
transferred to Taiwan. Ground forces on the island ended up with only the 24th and 62nd Divisions and the 44th Independent Mixed Brigade as the core of the Thirty-second Army commanded by Lieutenant General Mitsuru Ushijima

Commander of Okinawan defensive forces
Mitsuru Ushijima - Commander of Japanese Army forces in Okinawa
Isamu Cho - Sub Commander of Japanese Army forces in Okinawa

Deployable land units
Thirty-second Army - Mitsuru Ushijima
24th Division - Tatsumi Amamiya
62nd Division - Takeo Fujioka
Keiichi Arikawa: Commanding Officer Infantry Group 62nd Division, Okinawa
Kunisaki Detachment 
44th Independent Mixed Brigade
9th Division (transferred to Taiwan)
27th Tank Regiment - Lieut. Colonel Murakami

Air Squadrons in the area

Japanese Navy
Tokushima Air Group
Others Air Groups

Japanese Army
For the Okinawa campaign, the Army planned to commit a total of 970 
planes:

Homeland (Kyushu, Shikoku)
Sixth Air Army—220
Tokko units—300
Taiwan Area:
8th Air Division—200
Tokko units—250

Japanese Special Forces in Okinawa
Later elements of the Giretsu (Heroic) Airborne Unit were dropped upon North and Central Airfields, engaged in hand-to-hand fighting, and for a time seized control of both strips.

Military history of Japan during World War II